Elohi Gadugi Journal is an American magazine that publishes fiction, poetry, reviews, literary nonfiction, art, and multimedia with a social/environmental edge. It is published online in loosely themed quarterly issues. A print edition is to be published annually by Elohi Gadugi, an Oregon nonprofit in Portland, Oregon.

Elohi Gadugi Journal is particularly interested in Native American themes and marginal voices from throughout the world. Editor Duane Poncy is an enrolled citizen of the Cherokee Nation.

External links 
 Elohi Gadugi Journal website
 Elohi Gadugi website

2012 establishments in Oregon
Annual magazines published in the United States
American literature websites
Magazines established in 2012
Magazines published in Portland, Oregon
Native American magazines
Online literary magazines published in the United States
Quarterly magazines published in the United States